Johan Stenmark (born 26 February 1999) is a Swedish footballer who plays for Kalmar FF.

References

External links
 
 

1999 births
Living people
Swedish footballers
Allsvenskan players
Kalmar FF players
Association football defenders